Lesleh Donaldson (born April 7, 1964) is a Canadian actress who has worked in stage and film. After making her film debut in the drama Running (1979), she would appear in several horror films in the early 1980s, which earned her the title of "scream queen" among genre fans. These films include: Funeral Home (1980), Happy Birthday to Me (1981), Curtains (1983), and Deadly Eyes (1982). She also had a featured guest appearance on the  Friday the 13th: The Series (1987).

Early life
Donaldson was born in Toronto, Ontario. As a child, she studied at the Royal Conservatory of Music in Canada and appeared in early television commercials for Ford automobiles, as well as print ads for Sears. Donaldson's father was a professional operatic tenor.

Career
In the late 1970s, she appeared in several made-for-television movies including On My Own about a teenager suffering from epilepsy.

Her first theatrical film appearance was in Running (1979) starring Michael Douglas. She then starred in a number of theatrically released horror movies, including William Fruet's Funeral Home (also known as Cries in the Night) (1980), J. Lee Thompson's Happy Birthday to Me (1981), Deadly Eyes (1982) and Curtains (1983).

In 1982 Lesleh was nominated for the Best Performance by an Actress in a Leading Role Genie Award for her performance in Funeral Home. She also appeared in an episode of the television horror series Friday the 13th: The Series.

Filmography

Movies

Television

Stage credits

References

External links

Official Website

1964 births
Actresses from Toronto
Canadian film actresses
Canadian television actresses
Canadian stage actresses
Living people